Magdolna "Magda" Paulányi (née Vidos; born 19 June 1945) is a Hungarian athlete. She competed in the women's javelin throw at the 1972 Summer Olympics.

References

External links
 
 

1945 births
Living people
Athletes (track and field) at the 1972 Summer Olympics
Hungarian female javelin throwers
Olympic athletes of Hungary
Athletes from Budapest
Universiade silver medalists for Hungary
Universiade medalists in athletics (track and field)